ERA is a Bulgarian publishing house created by Tsvetelina Decheva (Dečeva; president) in 1996. It publishes mainly translated works by authors such as Jeffery Deaver, Orson Scott Card, Agatha Christie, Katerine Eliot, Stefan Kisyov and Aleksandr Belov.

References

External links
 ERA official website

Publishing companies established in 1996
Publishing companies of Bulgaria